Roman Vladimirovich Davydov (— 17 September 1988) was a Soviet and Russian animation director, animator, artist and educator. Honored Art Worker of the RSFSR (1979).

Biography
Roman Davydov was born in Moscow. As a kid he grew up in a house with stables; he watched horses for hours and drew them. His love for animal art and his knowledge of anatomy would later make him one of the most wanted animators every time someone directed movies involving animals, especially horses. According to Yevgeniy Migunov, only two other animators at Soyuzmultfilm could match him: Grigory Kozlov and Nikolay Fyodorov, both with their own approaches, and they always tried to best each other.

Davydov graduated from the Moscow Industrial Technikum and spent several years working as an engineer. In the free time he practiced the art of caricature. In 1932 the Telegraph Agency of the Soviet Union held out a competition for the best caricature where Davydov took the third place. This inspired him to went through professional training at the two-year courses organized by the Krokodil magazine, and in 1937 he joined animation courses at Soyuzmultfilm. His first movies date back to 1939.

He worked in traditional animation up until 1955 when he joined the recently opened puppet division of Soyuzmultfilm and produced several stop motion films. He was the only director of that time who used an old-fashioned, time-consuming method of filming dolls with changeable parts last practiced by Aleksandr Ptushko. In 1961 Davydov produced A Goatling, one of the first traditionally animated experiments of the Khrushchev Thaw that introduced a "formalistic", caricature art style in contrast with the realistic approach usual for that era. He continued developing it in his next projects, most notably the political satire Shareholders & Co (1963) and The Main Stellar (1966), a rare example of Soviet science fiction. Davydov experimented a lot with schematic, "angular", yet stylized characters, total animation, combinations of static composition and various details in motion, several panoramas moving at different speed in one shot and so on.

From 1967 to 1971 he directed his most famous work: the Adventures of Mowgli mini-series adapted from Rudyard Kipling's two Jungle Books. It consisted of five 20-minute episodes released yearly, and in 1973 they were combined into a feature film. The first episode was developed and released simultaneously with The Jungle Book by Disney and featured completely different style and mood. Made as a close adaptation of Kipling's writings, it allowed Davydov for a detailed study of the Indian wildlife and a mature storyline that featured a number of violent scenes, including the epic battle with red dogs from The Second Jungle Book (some critics linked it to the history of the Soviet Union).

Roman Davydov was also known for his Russian nationalism among colleagues. His film crews consisted almost exclusively of ethnic Russian animators and art directors (most commonly of Aleksandr Vinokurov, Pyotr Repkin and Viktor Nikitin), and after Mowgli he switched to adaptations of Russian historical events and folklore. Among them were Ratibor's Childhood (1973) based on the historical novel Primordial Rus' by Valentin Ivanov about the life of the East Slavs during the 6th century; Vasilisa Mikulishna (1975) that featured two bylina heroes: Stavr Godinovich and his wife Vasilisa Mikulishna, daughter of Mikula Selyaninovich; The Swans of Nepryadva (1980) dedicated to 600 years since the Battle of Kulikovo and A Tale of Evpaty Kolovrat (1985) about another medieval bogatyr, Evpaty Kolovrat. His last unfinished film was called A Letter from the XIII Century.

Apart from the work at Soyuzmultfilm Davydov also illustrated children's books based on his own films and led training courses for animators. He was also a member of ASIFA.

Roman Davydov died in 1988 after surviving a stroke and a heart attack. His son Aleksandr Davydov (25 January 1937 — 20 November 2012) was also a prominent Russian animator and animation director.

Filmography

Director

 1948 — A Hunting Gun (with Panteleymon Sazonov, also animator)
 1955 — Ballad of a Table (with Mikhail Kalinin, also art director)
 1956 — Kolobok (also art director)
 1958 — Three Bears
 1961 — A Goatling
 1961 — Hail to You, Sky Brothers! (with Ivan Aksenchuk)
 1962 — Living Numbers
 1963 — Shareholders & Co
 1964 — At the Edge of Mystery
 1965 — Gunan-Bator
 1966 — The Main Stellar
 1967-1971 — Adventures of Mowgli (also animator)
 1968 — Fitil  № 69 (Proprietor episode)
 1972 — Foka — Versatile Worker
 1973 — Ratibor's Childhood
 1973 — Who Pushed Me?
 1975 — Vasilisa Mikulishna
 1976 — Slashing Fellow
 1977 — Tom Thumb (with Aleksandr Trusov)
 1978 — The Last Bride of Zmey Gorynych
 1980 — The Swans of Nepryadva
 1982 — The Son of Stone
 1983 — A Hunter and His Son
 1983 — A Tablet
 1985 — A Tale of Evpaty Kolovrat
 1986 — The Son of Stone and a Giant

Animator

 1939 — War Chronicles
 1939 — Limpopo
 1940 — And We Are Out to Olympics
 1940 — Ivas'''
 1941 — Barmalei 1941 — Fly-Clatterfly 1942 — Fox, Hare and Rooster 1943 — Stolen Sun 1943 — The Tale of Tsar Saltan 1944 — Musical Joke 1944 — Telephone 1945 — Winter Tale 1945 — The Lost Letter 1945 — Teremok 1946 — The Song of Happiness 1947 — The Humpbacked Horse 1947 — Merry Garden 1947 — Quartet 1948 — Grey Neck 1949 — Miraculous Bell 1950 — The Tale of the Fisherman and the Fish 1950 — Magic Treasure 1950 — When New Year Trees Light Up 1950 — Deer and Wolf 1950 — Wonder Mill 1951 — The Night Before Christmas 1951 — Forest Adventurers 1951 — Brave Heart 1952 — The Scarlet Flower 1952 — Validub 1952 — Kashtanka 1952 — Sarmiko 1952 — The Snow Maiden 1953 — Magic Bird 1953 — Painted Fox 1953 — Flight to the Moon 1953 — Sister Alyonushka and Brother Ivanushka 1954 — The Golden Antelope 1954 — Dangerous Prank 1954 — Illegible Signature 1954 — Straw Bullock 1955 — Island of Mistakes 1955 — Dog and Cat 1955 — Golden Comb Rooster 1955 — Snowman-Postman 1955 — Brave Hare 1956 — Divinity 1957 — Familiar Pictures 1958 — Golden Wheats 1959 — It Will Rain Soon''

Honors and awards 

 Honored Art Worker of the RSFSR (1979)
 Order of the Red Banner of Labour (1986)

See also
 History of Russian animation

References

External links
 Roman Davydov at Animator.ru
 

1913 births
1988 deaths
Animal artists
Artists from Moscow
Recipients of the Order of the Red Banner of Labour
Russian animated film directors
Russian animators
Russian caricaturists
Soviet animation directors
Soviet animators
Soviet caricaturists